Gaël Monthurel (born January 22, 1966) is a French handball player who competed in the 1992 Summer Olympics and in the 1996 Summer Olympics.

In 1992 he was a member of the French handball team which won the bronze medal. He played three matches and scored four goals. Four years later he finished fourth with the French team in the 1996 Olympic tournament. He played four matches and scored three goals.

References

External links

1966 births
Living people
French male handball players
Olympic handball players of France
Handball players at the 1992 Summer Olympics
Handball players at the 1996 Summer Olympics
Olympic bronze medalists for France
Olympic medalists in handball
Medalists at the 1992 Summer Olympics